Football at the 2013 Mediterranean Games took place between 19 and 27 June. The tournament was held at the Tevfik Sırrı Gür Stadium,  and Tarsus City Stadium. The final was held at the Tevfik Sırrı Gür Stadium on 27 June. Associations affiliated with FIFA were invited to send their men's U-19 national teams. There was no women's tournament on this occasion.

Participating nations
Eight nations have applied to compete in men's tournament, four less than at the previous games. At least six nations competing is the requirement for tournament to be held. None of the Asian nations opted to compete.

Men

Format
 Eight teams are split into 2 preliminary round groups of 4 teams each. The top 2 teams from each group qualify for the main knockout stage, other team qualify for placement matches.
 In the semifinals, the matchups are as follows: A1 vs. B2 and B1 vs. A2
 The winning teams from the semifinals play for the gold medal. The losing teams compete for the bronze medal.

Squads

Preliminary round
All times are Eastern European Summer Time (UTC+3).

Group A

Group B

Classification stage

Classification 5–8 matches

Seventh place match

Fifth place match

Knockout stage

Semifinals

Bronze medal match

Gold medal match

Final standings

Medal Winning Squads

References

External links
Mediterranean Games 2013 (Turkey) - rsssf.com

football
2013
2013
2012–13 in Turkish football
2012–13 in Moroccan football
2012–13 in Tunisian football
2012–13 in Albanian football
2012–13 in Bosnia and Herzegovina football
2012–13 in Italian football
2012–13 in Republic of Macedonia football
2012–13 in Libyan football
2013 in youth association football